Donald Charles Alfred Crowhurst (1932 – July 1969) was a British businessman and amateur sailor who disappeared while competing in the Sunday Times Golden Globe Race, a single-handed, round-the-world yacht race. Soon after he started the race his ship began taking on water and he wrote that it would probably sink in heavy seas. He secretly abandoned the race while reporting false positions, in an attempt to appear to complete a circumnavigation without actually doing so. His ship's logbooks, found after his disappearance, suggest that the stress he was under and associated psychological deterioration may have led to his suicide.

Crowhurst's participation in the race has exerted a fascination over many commentators and artists. It has inspired a number of books, stage plays and films, including a documentary, Deep Water (2006), and two feature films, Crowhurst and The Mercy (both 2017), in which Crowhurst is played by the actors Justin Salinger and Colin Firth, respectively. His innovative but ill-prepared boat, the Teignmouth Electron, ended its days as a dive boat in the Caribbean and its decaying remains can still be found in the dunes above a beach in the Cayman Islands.

Early life
Crowhurst was born in 1932 in Ghaziabad, British India. His mother was a schoolteacher and his father worked in the Indian railways. During her pregnancy, his mother had longed for a daughter, and Crowhurst was dressed as a girl until the age of seven. After India gained its independence, his family moved back to England. The family's retirement savings were invested in an Indian sporting goods factory, which later burned down during rioting after the Partition of India.

Crowhurst's father died in 1948. Due to family financial problems, Crowhurst was forced to leave school early that year and started a five-year apprenticeship at the Royal Aircraft Establishment at Farnborough Airfield. In 1953 he received a Royal Air Force commission as a pilot, but was asked to leave in 1954 for reasons that remain unclear, and was subsequently commissioned into the Royal Electrical and Mechanical Engineers in 1956. After leaving the Army in the same year owing to a disciplinary incident, Crowhurst eventually moved to Bridgwater, where he started a business called Electron Utilisation in 1962. He was a member of the Liberal Party and was elected to Bridgwater Borough Council.

Business ventures
Crowhurst, a weekend sailor, designed and built a radio direction finder called the Navicator, a handheld device that allowed the user to take bearings on marine and aviation radio beacons. While he did have some success selling his navigational equipment, his business began to fail. In an effort to gain publicity, he started trying to gain sponsors to enter the Sunday Times Golden Globe Race.  His main sponsor was English entrepreneur Stanley Best, who had invested heavily in Crowhurst's failing business. Once committed to the race, Crowhurst mortgaged both his business and home against Best's continued financial support, placing himself in a grave financial situation.

The Golden Globe Race

The Golden Globe Race was inspired by Francis Chichester's successful single-handed round-the-world voyage, stopping in Sydney.  The considerable publicity his achievement garnered led a number of sailors to plan the next logical step – a non-stop, single-handed, round-the-world sail.

The Sunday Times had sponsored Chichester, with highly profitable results, and was interested in being involved with the first non-stop circumnavigation, but it had the problem of not knowing which sailor to sponsor. The solution was to promote the Golden Globe Race, a single-handed, round-the-world race, open to all comers, with automatic entry. That was in contrast to other races of the time, for which entrants were required to demonstrate their single-handed sailing ability prior to entry.

Entrants were required to start between 1 June and 31 October 1968, to pass through the Southern Ocean in summer. The prizes offered were the Golden Globe trophy for the first single-handed circumnavigation, and a £5,000 cash prize for the fastest.  This was then a considerable sum, equivalent to almost £80,000 in 2019.

The other contestants were Robin Knox-Johnston, Nigel Tetley, Bernard Moitessier, Chay Blyth, John Ridgway, William King, Alex Carozzo and Loïck Fougeron.  "Tahiti" Bill Howell, a noted multihull sailor and competitor in the 1964 and 1968 OSTAR races, originally signed up as an entrant but did not actually race.

Crowhurst hired Rodney Hallworth, a crime reporter for the Daily Mail and then the Daily Express, as his public relations officer.

Crowhurst's boat and preparations

The boat Crowhurst built for the voyage, Teignmouth Electron, was a modified  trimaran designed by Californian Arthur Piver. At the time, this was an unproven type of boat for a voyage of such length. Trimarans have the potential to sail much more quickly than monohulled sailboats, but early designs in particular could be very slow if overloaded, and had considerable difficulty sailing close to the wind. Trimarans are popular with many sailors for their stability, but if capsized (for example by a rogue wave), they are virtually impossible to right, though crews have lived for months with a boat in the inverted position and ultimately survived.

To improve the safety of the boat Crowhurst had planned to add an inflatable buoyancy bag on the top of the mast to prevent capsizing; the bag would be activated by water sensors on the hull designed to detect an impending capsize.  This innovation would hold the mast horizontal on the surface of the water, and a clever arrangement of pumps would allow him to flood the uppermost outer hull, which would (in conjunction with wave action) pull the boat upright.  His scheme was to prove these devices by sailing round the world with them, then go into business manufacturing the system.

However, Crowhurst had a very short time in which to build and equip his boat while securing financing and sponsors for the race.  In the end, all of his safety devices were left uncompleted; he planned to complete them while under way. Also, many of his spares and supplies were left behind in the confusion of the final preparations.  To top all this, Crowhurst had never sailed on a trimaran before taking delivery of his boat several weeks before the beginning of the race.

On 13 October an experienced sailor, Lieutenant Commander Peter Eden, volunteered to accompany Crowhurst on his last leg from Cowes to Teignmouth. Crowhurst had fallen into the water several times while in Cowes, and as he and Eden climbed aboard Teignmouth Electron, he once again ended up in the water after slipping on the outboard bracket on the stern of the rubber dinghy. Eden's description of his two days with Crowhurst provides the most expert independent assessment available for both boat and sailor before the start of the race. He recalls that the trimaran sailed immensely swiftly, but could get no closer to the wind than 60 degrees. The speed often reached 12 knots, but the vibrations encountered caused the screws on the Hasler self-steering gear to come loose. Eden said, "We had to keep leaning over the counter to do up the screws. It was a tricky and time consuming business. I told Crowhurst he should get the fixings welded if he wanted it to survive a longer trip!" Eden also commented that the Hasler worked superbly and the boat was "certainly nippy."

Eden reported that Crowhurst's sailing techniques were good, "But I felt his navigation was a mite slapdash. I prefer, even in the Channel, to know exactly where I am. He didn't take too much bother with it, merely jotting down figures on a few sheets of paper from time to time." After struggling against westerlies and having to tack out into the Channel twice, they arrived at 2.30 pm on 15 October, where an enthusiastic BBC film crew started filming Eden in the belief he was Crowhurst. There were 16 days to get ready before the race's deadline on 31 October.

Departure and deception
Crowhurst left from Teignmouth, Devon, on the last day permitted by the rules: 31 October 1968.  He encountered immediate problems with his boat, his equipment, and his lack of open-ocean sailing skills and experience. In the first few weeks he was making less than half of his planned speed.

According to his logs, he gave himself only 50/50 odds of surviving the ocean assuming that he was able to complete some of the boat's safety features before reaching the dangerous Southern Ocean.  Crowhurst was thus faced with the choice of either quitting the race and facing financial ruin and humiliation or continuing to an almost certain death in his unseaworthy, disappointing boat.

Over the course of November and December 1968, the hopelessness of his situation pushed him into an elaborate deception.  He shut down his radio with a plan to loiter in the South Atlantic for several months while the other boats sailed the Southern Ocean, falsify his navigation logs, then slip back in for the return leg to England. As last-place finisher, he assumed his false logs would not receive the same scrutiny as those of the winner.

Since leaving, Crowhurst had been deliberately ambiguous in his radio reports of his location. Starting on 6 December 1968, he continued reporting vague but false positions; rather than continuing to the Southern Ocean, he sailed erratically in the southern Atlantic Ocean and stopped once in South America to make repairs to his boat, in violation of the rules. A great deal of the voyage was spent in radio silence, while his supposed position was inferred by extrapolation based on his earlier reports. By early December, based on his false reports, he was being cheered worldwide as the likely winner of the fastest circumnavigation prize, though Francis Chichester privately expressed doubts about the plausibility of Crowhurst's progress.

After rounding the tip of South America in early February, Moitessier had made a dramatic decision in March to drop out of the race and to sail on towards Tahiti. On 22 April 1969, Robin Knox-Johnston was the first to complete the race, leaving Crowhurst supposedly in the running against Tetley for second to finish, and possibly still able to beat Knox-Johnston's time, due to his later starting date. In reality, Tetley was far in the lead, having long ago passed within  of Crowhurst's hiding place; but believing himself to be running neck-and neck with Crowhurst, Tetley pushed his failing boat, also a  Piver trimaran, to breaking point, and had to abandon ship on 30 May.

The pressure on Crowhurst had therefore increased, since he now looked certain to win the "elapsed time" race. If he appeared to have completed the fastest circumnavigation, his logbooks would be closely examined by experienced sailors, including the experienced and sceptical Chichester, and the deception would probably be exposed. It is also likely that he felt guilty about undermining Tetley's genuine circumnavigation so near its completion. He had by this time begun to make his way back as if he had rounded Cape Horn.

Crowhurst ended radio transmissions on 29 June. The last logbook entry is dated 1 July. Teignmouth Electron was found adrift, unoccupied, on 10 July.

Mental condition and final philosophical writings 
Crowhurst's behaviour as recorded in his logs indicates a complex and troubled psychological state.  His commitment to fabricating the voyage reports seems incomplete and self-defeating, as he reported unrealistically fast progress that was sure to arouse suspicion. By contrast, he spent many hours painstakingly constructing false log entries, often more difficult to complete than real entries due to the celestial navigation research required.

The last several weeks of his log entries, once he was facing the real possibility of winning the prize, showed increasing irrationality. His biographers, Nicholas Tomalin and Ron Hall, believe that faced with a choice between two impossible situations—either admit his fraud and then face public shame and likely financial ruin, or return home to a fraudulent hero's reception, and then have to live with the guilt and possible subsequent unmasking—Crowhurst descended into a "classical paranoia", a "psychotic disorder in which deluded ideas are built into a complex, intricate structure." Others, including practising clinical psychologist Geoff Powter, who included a chapter devoted to Crowhurst in his book "Strange and Dangerous Dreams: The Fine Line Between Adventure and Madness", have postulated that Crowhurst may have suffered from undiagnosed bipolar disorder, which, accentuated by his eventual psychologically fraught situation, could account for his apparent alternation between "manic" and "depressed" episodes as evident from the later entries in his logbooks.  On 24 June, he began to document these thoughts in a new set of writings in his second logbook, entitled "Philosophy". Although rambling and incoherent at times, he was attempting to set down, for the benefit of mankind, a "revelation" or new understanding that he believed he had discovered regarding the relationship between man and the universe. Life, as experienced by man, was a "game", overseen by "cosmic beings", apparently God (or several gods) and the Devil, who set the rules by which "the game" was played. However, man could, by an effort of will, become one such "second generation cosmic being" himself, and thereby withdraw from "the game" on his own terms if he so wished. He would then enter a world of "abstract intelligence" (the realm of gods) in which he would have no need for his body, or any of the other trappings of daily life. At one point he wrote that this "revelation" made him happy:

whereas at other points his writings documenting mental arguments—with himself, with Albert Einstein, or with God—reveal a tortured soul on the brink of self destruction. While suicide is not explicitly mentioned as an escape route, Tomalin and Hall believe that Crowhurst (whether or not he was admitting it to himself) was groping towards this eventuality with phrases such as "The quick are quick, and the dead are dead. That is the judgement of God. I could not have endured the terrible anguish and meaningless waiting, in fact.", as well as "Man is forced to certain conclusions by virtue of his mistakes."

He continued his writings for a week, eventually amounting to more than 25,000 words. At 10 a.m. on 1 July (by his own reckoning, since in his meditations he had omitted to wind his chronometer and had to subsequently re-start it), Crowhurst commenced what Tomalin and Hall believed to be his "final confession", also incorporating (in their view) a count of hours, minutes and seconds towards the time at which he had decided that he would end "the game" by committing suicide. His observations over the next 80 minutes are generally cryptic and/or incomplete, but include hints such as:

It is unclear from the spacing whether "11 20 40" was the time of his last entry, or whether it runs on from the preceding wording as his intended time for his ultimate action. Likewise, while the phrase "IT IS THE MERCY" is obscure, most commentators have accepted that it signifies his relief that, at last, he is leaving an unbearable situation.

Tomalin and Hall conjecture that included in his last writings (not all reproduced above) were sentences that cover Crowhurst's internal debate over whether or not to leave the evidence of his actual, rather than faked, journey for posterity to see, and that he decided that the former was the better course; in the event, it was the "true" logbook that was left behind, and the "fake" one (if it ever existed) disappeared, along with the vessel's chronometer (its case was found empty), and Crowhurst himself. The disappearance of the vessel's chronometer (clock), apparently following Crowhurst's final diary entry, remains unexplained.

Disappearance and presumed death 
Crowhurst's last log entry was on 1 July 1969; it is assumed that he then either fell or jumped overboard and drowned. The state of the boat gave no indication that it had been overrun by a rogue wave, or that any accident had occurred which might have caused Crowhurst to fall overboard. From his apparent state of mind as indicated by his most recent logbook entries and philosophical statements, it seems likely that he deliberately decided to take his own life, possibly in an effort to become a "second generation cosmic being" according to his belief (and thereupon have no further need for his earthly body), although the possibility that he met with some sort of accident, intending to return to continue writing in his logbook, cannot be completely dismissed. Three logbooks (two navigational logs and a radio log) and a large mass of other papers were left on his boat to communicate his philosophical ideas and to reveal his actual navigational course during the voyage. The boat was found with the mizzen sail up. Although his biographers, Tomalin and Hall, discounted the possibility that some sort of food poisoning contributed to his mental deterioration, they acknowledged that there is insufficient evidence to rule it, or several other hypotheses, out. They also acknowledged that other hypotheses could be constructed, involving further deception—such as that Crowhurst had perhaps faked his own death, and somehow survived—but that these were extremely unlikely.

Clare Crowhurst, Donald's widow, strongly disputed the theory put forward by Tomalin and Hall regarding the circumstances of her husband's deception and demise, accusing them of mixing fiction with fact. In a letter to The Times published on 10 July 1970, she contended that there was no evidence that her husband had intended to write a fake logbook (none was in fact found), that his death could equally have been as the result of misadventure (such as an accident while climbing the mast, which a logbook entry showed that he intended to do before 30 June), and also that Tomalin believed that "all heroes are neurotics, and starting off with this theory, he has sought to prove it by the history of Donald from the earliest age until his death". Nevertheless, later commentators have agreed with Tomalin and Hall's general conclusions, that Crowhurst's long sojourn alone at sea, coupled with his being placed in an impossible dilemma, led to his eventual psychological breakdown and resulting probable suicide.

Aftermath

After the race

Teignmouth Electron was found adrift and abandoned on 10 July 1969 by the RMV Picardy, at latitude 33 degrees 11 minutes North and longitude 40 degrees 26 minutes West.  News of Crowhurst's disappearance led to an air and sea search in the vicinity of the boat and its last estimated course.  Examination of his recovered logbooks and papers revealed the attempt at deception, his mental breakdown and eventual presumed suicide.  This was reported in the press at the end of July, creating a media sensation.

Prior to the deception being revealed, Robin Knox-Johnston donated his £5,000 winnings for fastest circumnavigation to Donald Crowhurst's widow and children. Nigel Tetley was awarded a consolation prize and built a new trimaran.

Teignmouth council considered a proposal to exhibit the boat, charging visitors 2/6d per head, with profits to go to Crowhurst's wife and four children.

Teignmouth Electron was later taken to Jamaica and was sold several times, being re-purposed and re-fitted, first as a cruise boat in Montego Bay and later as a dive boat in the Cayman Islands, before being hauled out following a minor incident in 1983 but later damaged by a hurricane and never repaired. The boat still lies decaying on the southwest shore of Cayman Brac.

Reputation and reappraisal
If Crowhurst had finished the race, his fake coordinates would undoubtedly have been exposed and he would have been treated as a fraud, in addition to being in probable financial ruin. From his surviving logbooks it is unclear whether his eventual presumed suicide was to avoid having to confront such a situation and/or to seek an "honourable" exit without disrespecting his family, or whether his final metaphysical ramblings, which could also be interpreted as evidence of mental instability, led to his abandoning the world and his body in search of a more spiritual objective. Either way, near-contemporary accounts of his actions were not particularly sympathetic. The 1970 book The Strange Last Voyage of Donald Crowhurst by two Sunday Times journalists is described as "largely unflattering" in a recent account. Some more recent commentators have viewed Crowhurst as a well-intentioned but tragic figure who became caught up in a situation that was initially of his own making but that he could not control. James Marsh, the director of the film The Mercy, has said: "He made a pretty good go at sailing round the world. He stayed out in the ocean for the best part of seven months so all in all, he achieved much more than people ever thought he could, he just didn't achieve what his objective was. It was a case of over-reach, it was hubris and that is what caused the tragedy of his demise."

Jonathan Raban has written that

Tomalin and Hall wrote in 1970:

In popular culture

Movies and documentaries
 Donald Crowhurst – Sponsored for Heroism (1970) a BBC TV film written and narrated by Paul Foot and directed by Colin Thomas
 Horse Latitudes was a 1975 television movie about Crowhurst (called ‘’Philip Stockton, a Canadian’’ in the film).
 Alone was a 1979 BBC South West television documentary about Crowhurst with investigative journalist Jeremy James. The documentary aired on the tenth anniversary of Crowhurst's disappearance.
The 1982 French movie Les Quarantièmes rugissants ("The Roaring Forties") is directly inspired by the Crowhurst story.
The 1986 Soviet film   Race of the Century  gives a dramatic presentation of the events of the Golden Globe Race and the fate of Donald Crowhurst (Leonhard Merzin). The movie focuses on the idea of competition in a capitalist society as a soul-consuming "rat race", where all community members including children are under constant pressure and failure and poverty are not tolerated. It portrays Crowhurst as a deeply honest man being forced into a dangerous unwinnable enterprise by his disastrous financial situation and the greed of entrepreneur Best. Crowhurst's suicide is ascribed chiefly to the inability of a moral person to survive in an immoral society. The film includes a portrayal of the Crowhurst family and a dramatic enactment of Donald's descent into insanity leading to fatalism. This film has passed relatively unnoticed, and today it is known mainly because Natalia Guseva  played the role of Crowhurst's daughter Rachel.
The Two Voyages of Donald Crowhurst, a thirty-minute BBC Two documentary first broadcast in 1993.
British artist Tacita Dean created two experimental short films entitled Disappearance at Sea I (1996, 6 minutes?) and II (1997, 16-mm film, 4-min. loop), partly inspired by the story of Donald Crowhurst. She also published an art book about Teignmouth Electron (Book Works, London, 1999), journeying to Cayman Brac to visit the wreck of the boat. Out of the latter project also came a photographic piece and another short film Teignmouth Electron 2000 (16-mm film, 7 minutes).
Film Four commissioned a documentary based on the affair in 2006, called Deep Water. The film reconstructs Crowhurst's voyage from his own audio tapes and cine film, interwoven with archive footage and interviews. It was described as 'fascinating' by the New York Times upon its release.
 In 2013 a short film called Une route sans kilomètre was made Sophie Proux and Laurent Lagarrigue, telling Crowhurst's story. 
 2017 saw the release of Crowhurst, directed by Simon Rumley. The executive producer of the film was Nicolas Roeg, who had himself attempted to film the story in the 1970s.
 The Mercy was released in 2018 with Colin Firth as Donald Crowhurst and Rachel Weisz as Clare, supported by David Thewlis, Ken Stott and Jonathan Bailey. The film was directed by James Marsh and filmed in Teignmouth, Devon.

Stage
At the 1991 Edinburgh Festival Fringe a one-man stage play "Strange Voyage" was performed in the former Ukrainian Church Halls on Dalmeny Street in Leith. The story was based upon Donald's diaries and broadcast messages sent and received, creating a haunting story of lost hope and looking at the issue of choosing death rather than shame.
Playwright/actor Chris Van Strander's 1999 play Daniel Pelican adapted the Crowhurst story to a 1920s setting. It was staged site-specifically aboard New York City's FRYING PAN Lightship.
In 1998 the New York-based theatre group The Builders' Association based the first half of their production "Jet Lag" on Crowhurst's story, although they changed the character's name to Richard Dearborn. (See G. Giesekam, Staging The Screen, Palgrave Macmillan, 2007, 151–6)
Jonathan Rich's play "The Lonely Sea" was runner-up in the Sunday Times International Student Playscript competition in 1979 and was performed by the National Youth Theatre in Edinburgh that year. It was premiered professionally in 1980, as "Single Handed" at the Warehouse Theatre in Croydon.
The opera Ravenshead (1998) was based on Donald Crowhurst's story. Steven Mackey (composer), Rinde Eckert (solo performance), The Paul Dresher Ensemble (orchestra).
Actor and playwright Daniel Brian's award-winning 2004 stage play Almost A Hero, dealt with Crowhurst's voyage, descent into madness and death.
In 2015, Calgary, Canada-based Alberta Theatre Projects in association with Ghost River Theatre premiered the multimedia-heavy "The Last Voyage of Donald Crowhurst" by Eric Rose and David Van Belle.
In 2016, Ottawa, actor Jake William Smith portrayed Crowhurst in a one-man show entitled "Crow's Nest" at the Fresh Meat Festival.

Factual books
The Strange Last Voyage of Donald Crowhurst, Nicholas Tomalin and Ron Hall. First published January 1970.
A Voyage for Madmen, Peter Nichols. Published May 2001.
Psychiatrist Edward M. Podvoll included an in-depth account of Donald Crowhurst's journey in his 1990 book The Seduction of Madness: Revolutionary Insights into the World of Psychosis and a Compassionate Approach to Recovery at Home. The account focuses on Crowhurst's journals and the changes and decline in mental status that the entries reveal.

Novels
In 2009, Isabelle Autissier, herself a renowned sailor, published the novel Seule la mer s'en souviendra (roughly translates as "Only the sea will remember") based on Crowhurst's voyage.
The 1993 book Outerbridge Reach by Robert Stone (Dog Soldiers, Children of Light) is a novel inspired by the reporting on Crowhurst.
The title character of Jonathan Coe's 2010 novel The Terrible Privacy of Maxwell Sim is driven by his obsession with Crowhurst's story.
In the 2010 travelogue Travels with Miss Cindy, Miss Cindy sees Teignmouth Electron on the beach at Cayman Brac.
A 1999 novel by John Preston, Ink, has a reporter who tracks down an elderly former yachtsman like Crowhurst living alone in a remote English seaside hotel.
The 2017 novel The Ship Beyond Time, by Heidi Heilig, features Donald Crowhurst in an imaginary alternate universe in which he has time traveled away from his failing boat, rather than dying at sea.

Poetry
American poet Donald Finkel based his 1987 book-length narrative poem The Wake of the Electron on Crowhurst's life and fateful voyage.

Others
The Scottish band Trashcan Sinatras recorded a song about Crowhurst on their Wild Pendulum album. The title is “Waves (Sweep Away My Meloncholy), which was one of the final entries in the log books of Crowhurst’s ill-fated journey.
The Stiltskin song "Horse" on their 1994 album The Mind's Eye was written about the ill-fated voyage from Donald Crowhurst's perspective.
British musician the Third Eye Foundation released a song called "Donald Crowhurst" on the album Ghost.
British jazz musician Django Bates included a track called "The Strange Voyage of Donald Crowhurst" on his 1997 album Like Life.
British dark folk/neofolk project Sieben has a trilogy of songs dedicated to Donald Crowhurst on the "Star Wood Brick Firmament" 2010 album: "Donald", "Crowhurst" and "Floating". It was completely re-recorded in 2021 as "Donald Crowhurst" for the single "Minack Theatre".
US experimental metal/noise project Crowhurst by Jay Gambit was named after the Donald Crowhurst story. Also the project's 2013 album "In the Speedboat Under the Sea" is inspired by the Donald Crowhurst story - and the album's closing track is called "The Last Will and Testament of Donald Crowhurst".
Scottish band Captain and the Kings released a single in early 2011 entitled "It Is The Mercy", based on Crowhurst's exploits.
British band I Like Trains wrote a song called "The Deception", which appears on their album Elegies to Lessons Learnt, based upon Donald Crowhurst's story.
South London hardcore band Lay It on the Line released 'Crowhurst' – a 9-song re-telling of Crowhurst's story – in 2013.
Folk singer, actor and writer Benjamin Akira Tallamy wrote and recorded "The Teignmouth Electron" based around Crowhurst's breakdown and his death at sea. The song was released on 19 October 2014 with a music video uploaded to YouTube on the same day.
The band Crash of Rhinos released the song "Speeds of Ocean Greyhounds" in 2013. It appears as the closing track on the band's second and final album "Knots" and was written about Crowhurst's voyage and last days at sea.
The band OSI has a song named "Radiologue", released on their third album, Blood, which appears to be inspired by the story of Crowhurst.
UK singer-songwriter Adam Barnes' "Electron" (released in 2017) is about the psychotic episodes of Crowhurst's voyage.
British singer-songwriter Peter Hammill released in 2009 the song "The Mercy", quoting the last entry in the log of Donald Crowhurst.
The album "Battlefield Dance Floor" by British folk group Show of Hands includes the song "Lost" inspired by the story.
British Singer-Songwriter Ben Howard released in 2021 the song "Crowhurst's Meme", which appears to be inspired by the story of Crowhurst.
British Prog band Frost* released in 2021 the song "Terrestrial", which is about Donald Crowhurst who disappeared while competing in the Sunday Times Golden Globe Race never to be found.
Romanian writer Radu Cosașu has a book named "Un august pe un bloc de gheață" (An August on a Block of Ice), which contains numerous references to the story of Crowhurst.

Notes

See also
List of people who disappeared mysteriously at sea

References

Bibliography

Further reading
 The 1970 book  The Strange Last Voyage of Donald Crowhurst by Nicholas Tomalin and Ron Hall is an account of the life of Donald Crowhurst and the events leading up to and during the race.
 The 1999 book Fakes, Frauds, and Flimflammery by Andreas Schroeder, devotes an entire chapter to Crowhurst's adventure.
 A Voyage for Madmen (1997) by Peter Nichols tells the story of the 1968 race and all its entrants.
 Without trace: the last voyages of eight ships (1981) by John Harris features the Teighnmouth Electron as one of its eight subjects.
 Jonathan Raban's article The long, strange legacy of Donald Crowhurst. (Cruising World, January 2001) contains an approximately 30-year retrospective view on the original 1970 account by Tomalin and Hall.
 Amazing Sailing Stories: True Adventures from the High Seas (2011) by Dick Durham includes a chapter on Crowhurst entitled "Sailing into Madness", with some recent comments from Donald's son, Simon Crowhurst.
 The 2016 book Desperate Voyage: Donald Crowhurst, The London Sunday Times Golden Globe Race, and the Tragedy of Teignmouth Electron by Edward Renehan is a recent retelling of the story.

External links
  – includes map of actual and false journey
 Official Crowhurst family page with a selection of family photographs
 Contemporary photographs of Crowhurst and the Teignmouth Electron from the archives of the Sunday Times, 1968-1969
 Image search result for "Donald Crowhurst sailor" on Getty Images
 Alamy stock images of the remains of the Teignmouth Electron on Cayman Brac, as they were in 1991

1932 births
1960s missing person cases
1968 hoaxes
1969 suicides
Councillors in Somerset
English male sailors (sport)
English sailors
Liberal Party (UK) councillors
Missing people
People from Ghaziabad, Uttar Pradesh
People lost at sea
Single-handed sailors
Suicides by drowning
Date of birth missing
Place of death missing